The Kenbak-1 is considered by the Computer History Museum, the Computer Museum of America and the American Computer Museum to be the world's first "personal computer", invented by John Blankenbaker (born 1929) of Kenbak Corporation in 1970, and first sold in early 1971.  Less than 50 machines were ever built using  Bud Industries enclosures as its housing. The system first sold for US$750.  Today, only 14 machines are known to exist worldwide, in the hands of various collectors and museums. Production of the Kenbak-1 stopped in 1973 as Kenbak failed, and was taken over by CTI Education Products, Inc.  CTI rebranded the inventory and renamed it the 5050, though sales remained elusive.

Since the Kenbak-1 was invented before the first microprocessor, the machine didn't have a one-chip CPU but instead was based purely on small-scale integration TTL chips. The 8-bit machine offered 256 bytes of memory, implemented on Intel's type 1404A silicon gate MOS shift registers. The clock signal period was 1 microsecond (equivalent to an clock speed of 1 MHz), but the program speed averaged below 1000 instructions per second due many clock cycles needed for each operation and slow access to serial memory.

The machine was programmed in pure machine code using an array of buttons and switches. Output consisted of a row of lights.

Internally, the Kenbak-1 has a serial computer architecture, processing one bit at a time.

Technical description

Registers

The Kenbak-1 has a total of nine registers. All are memory mapped. It has three general-purpose registers: A, B and X. Register A is the implicit destination of some operations. Register X is also known as the index register and turns the direct and indirect modes into indexed direct and indexed indirect modes. It also has program counter, called Register P, three "overflow and carry" registers for A, B and X respectively as well as an Input Register and an Output Register.

Addressing modes
Add, Subtract, Load, Store, Load Compliment, And, and Or instructions operate between a register and another operand using five addressing modes:

 Immediate (operand is in second byte of instruction)
 Memory (second byte of instruction is the address of the operand)
 Indirect (second byte of instruction is the address of the address of the operand)
 Indexed (second byte of instruction is added to X to form the address of the operand)
 Indirect Indexed (second byte of instruction points to a location which is added to X to form the address of the operand)

Instruction table
The instructions are encoded in 8 bits, with a possible second byte providing an immediate value or address. Some instructions have multiple possible encodings.

See also
Datapoint 2200, a contemporary machine with alphanumeric screen and keyboard, suitable to run non-trivial application programs
Mark-8, designed by graduate student Jonathan A. Titus and announced as a 'loose kit' in the July 1974 issue of Radio-Electronics magazine
Altair 8800, a very popular 1975 microcomputer that provided the inspiration for starting Microsoft

References

External links
Kenbak.com Comprehensive Kenbak-1 history and technical information
KENBAK-1 Computer Article
KENBAK-1 Computer – Official Kenbak-1 website at www.kenbak-1.info
KENBAK-1 Series 2 – Official Kenbak-1 reproduction kit at www.kenbakkit.com
Kenbak-1 Emulator – Online Kenbak-1 Emulator
Kenbak-1 Emulator – Kenbak-1 Emulator download
Kenbak 1 – Images and information at www.vintage-computer.com
Kenbak documentation at bitsavers.org
KENBAK-uino Hardware-based Kenbak-1 Emulator
Recreating the First PC article about KENBAK-uino at hackaday.com
KENBAK-1 Emulator/Trainer, RetroWiki.es  (Invalid, 2015-02-10)
The Kenbak-1 Prototype, Official Kenbak-1 prototype website at www.thefirstpc.com
Early microcomputers
Computer-related introductions in 1971
Serial computers
8-bit computers